The 2013 HP Open was a women's tennis tournament played on outdoor hard courts sponsored by Hewlett-Packard. It was the fifth edition of the HP Open, and part of the WTA International tournaments of the 2013 WTA Tour. It was held at the Utsubo Tennis Center in Osaka, Japan, from October 7 through October 13, 2013.

Singles main-draw entrants

Seeds

 Rankings are as of September 30, 2013

Other entrants
The following players received wildcards into the singles main draw:
  Kurumi Nara 
  Laura Robson

The following players received entry from the qualifying draw:
  Anna Karolína Schmiedlová
  Luksika Kumkhum
  Barbora Záhlavová-Strýcová
  Belinda Bencic

The following player received entry as a lucky loser:
  Vania King

Withdrawals
Before the tournament
  Marina Erakovic
  Jamie Hampton
  Jelena Janković (left hip injury)
  Bethanie Mattek-Sands
  Shahar Pe'er (planta fascia injury)
  Yaroslava Shvedova
  Galina Voskoboeva
  Venus Williams

During the tournament
  Sabine Lisicki (left hip injury)

Doubles main-draw entrants

Seeds

1 Rankings are as of September 30, 2013

Other entrants
The following pairs received wildcards into the doubles main draw:
  Misaki Doi /  Miki Miyamura
  Kurumi Nara /  Risa Ozaki

Withdrawals
During the tournament
  Polona Hercog (back injury)
  Varvara Lepchenko (gastrointestinal illness)

Champions

Singles

 Samantha Stosur def.  Eugenie Bouchard, 3–6, 7–5, 6–2
 It was Stosur's 2nd title of the year and the 5th of her career.

Doubles

 Kristina Mladenovic /  Flavia Pennetta def.  Samantha Stosur /  Zhang Shuai, 6–4, 6–3

External links

 
HP Open
HP Open
HP Open
October 2013 sports events in Asia